Anthony Edward Pierce (born 16 January 1941) was the Bishop of Swansea and Brecon in the Church in Wales from 1999 to 2008.

Career
Pierce was educated at Dynevor School, Swansea, and at Swansea University and Linacre College, Oxford. After studying at Ripon College Cuddesdon he was ordained in 1966.

In Swansea he held curacies at St Peter's Church (1965–1967) and at St Mary's Church, Swansea (1967–1974), before being appointed vicar of Llwynderw in 1974 - a position he held until 1992. He was then chaplain of Singleton Hospital (1980-1995), Secretary of the Diocesan Conference (1991-1995) and Diocesan Director of Education (1992-1999).

Pierce served as Archdeacon of Gower from 1995 to 1999 and Rector of St Mary's Church, Swansea a from 1996 to 1999 when he was ordained to the episcopate as enthroned as 8th Bishop of Swansea and Brecon. He retired in 2008.

On 10 December 2016, celebrations for the 50th anniversary of Bishop Anthony's ordination as a Priest took place at St Mary's Church, Swansea where he had served as Curate, and then Rector of St Mary's Church, Swansea before he was ordained to the episcopate.

References

Bishops of Swansea and Brecon
People from Swansea
1941 births
People educated at Dynevor School, Swansea
Alumni of Swansea University
Alumni of Linacre College, Oxford
Alumni of Ripon College Cuddesdon
Archdeacons of Gower
20th-century bishops of the Church in Wales
21st-century bishops of the Church in Wales
Living people